Louis Ducreux (22 September 1911 – 19 December 1992) was a French actor, screenwriter and composer. 

He was born Louis Raymond Bordat in Marseille, France. He made his film debut in 1938 and worked until his death. He received a Best Actor nomination at the César Awards in 1985 for Bertrand Tavernier's A Sunday in the Country. He also worked on Max Ophüls's La Ronde as a lyricist, writing the title theme "La ronde de l'amour". Ducreux died in Paris at the age of 81.

Filmography

References

External links
 

1911 births
1992 deaths
French male composers
Mass media people from Marseille
French male film actors
French male stage actors
20th-century French male actors
20th-century French composers
20th-century French male musicians